Wayne Levere Hays (May 13, 1911 – February 10, 1989) was an American politician who served as a U.S. Representative of Ohio, in the Democratic Party, from 1949 to 1976. He resigned from Congress after a much-publicized sex scandal.

Early years
Hays was born in Bannock, Ohio, the son of Bertha Taylor and Walter L. Hays. He graduated from Ohio State University in 1933. He served as mayor of Flushing, Ohio, from 1939 to 1945 and simultaneously served in the Ohio state senate in 1941 and 1942. Starting in 1945 he served a four-year term as Commissioner of Belmont County. He was a member of the Army Officers' Reserve Corps from 1933 until called to active duty as a second lieutenant on December 8, 1941, with a medical discharge in August 1942.

Politics

Hays, a Democrat, was elected to the 81st Congress in 1948, and was subsequently elected to thirteen succeeding Congresses. He was chairman of the powerful Committee on House Administration.

Hays received 5 votes for President at the 1972 Democratic National Convention without campaigning for the office. In 1976, Hays ran for the party's nomination for President as a favorite son candidate in the Ohio primary.

Hays's strong rule of the House Administration Committee extended to even the smallest items. In the mid-1970s, lawmakers avoided crossing Hays for fear that he would shut off the air conditioning in their offices.

Sex scandal
In May 1976, the Washington Post broke the story quoting Elizabeth Ray, Hays' former secretary, saying that Hays hired her on his staff, and later gave her a raise as staff of the House Administration Committee for two years, to serve as his mistress. Hays had divorced his wife of 38 years just months prior, and married his veteran Ohio office secretary, Patricia Peak, five weeks before the scandal broke. Ostensibly a secretary, Ray admitted: "I can't type. I can't file. I can't even answer the phone." She even "let a reporter listen in as the Ohio congressman told her on the phone that his recent marriage (to another former secretary) would not affect their arrangement."

Time Magazine reported, "Liz chose to tell her story after Hays decided to marry Pat Peak and did not invite her. 'I was good enough to be his mistress for two years but not good enough to be invited to his wedding,' she pouted." Three days later, Hays admitted to most of the allegations on the House floor, denying only "that Miss Ray's federal salary was awarded solely for sexual services. She was not, insisted Hays, 'hired to be my mistress.'" He resigned as chairman of the Committee on House Administration on June 18, 1976, and then resigned from Congress on September 1, 1976.

Marion L. Clark, a Washington Post editor, who was a member of team that reported the sex scandal, was killed September 4, 1977, when she reportedly walked into a moving small private airplane propeller at the airfield of Iosco County Airport, East Tawas, Michigan.

Personal life
Hays and his first wife had a daughter, Martha Brigitta.

Later years
After leaving office, Hays returned to Red Gate Farm, his 300-acre property in Belmont, Ohio, where he bred Angus cattle and Tennessee Walking Horses. Hays served one term, from 1979 to 1981, as member of the Ohio House of Representatives. He was defeated for re-election by future Congressman Bob Ney.

Hays died at Wheeling Hospital in Wheeling, West Virginia, on February 10, 1989, at the age of 77, after suffering a heart attack at his home.

See also
 List of United States representatives from Ohio
 List of federal political scandals in the United States
 List of federal political sex scandals in the United States

External sources
Closed Session Romance on the Hill: Rep. Wayne Hays' $14,000-a-Year Clerk Says She's His Mistress, Washington Post, May 23, 1976.
Indecent Exposure on Capitol Hill, Time Magazine, June 7, 1976.

References

External links

 

1911 births
1989 deaths
20th-century American politicians
Candidates in the 1972 United States presidential election
Candidates in the 1976 United States presidential election
County commissioners in Ohio
Democratic Party members of the United States House of Representatives from Ohio
Mayors of places in Ohio
Democratic Party members of the Ohio House of Representatives
Democratic Party Ohio state senators
Ohio State University alumni
People from Belmont, Ohio
People from Flushing, Ohio